The 1983 Durham mayoral election was held on November 8, 1983 to elect the mayor of Durham, North Carolina. It saw the reelection of incumbent mayor Charles Markham

Results

References 

Durham
Mayoral elections in Durham, North Carolina
Durham